Genie Gets Her Wish is the first VHS/DVD by Christina Aguilera. It was released on December 14, 1999 through RCA Records. It features performances of her #1 single, "Genie in a Bottle", studio footage, live concert performances, and exclusive peeks backstage. It was certified Platinum by the Recording Industry Association of America (RIAA). It peaked at number 1 in Sweden. Originally released on VHS, it was later re-released on DVD the following year.

Background  

Aguilera told the MTV Radio Network about the DVD:"It will be interesting to see all the kinds of sides of me. Cause you do get to see me onstage, you know, 'Christina Aguilera onstage.'
"But then, what happens whenever the cameras (are) off?" she continued. "She goes home, takes off her makeup, and gets ready for bed? You know, (what happens) after all these fans are done (with the show) and after she's done meeting them and signing autographs? What's she like? I'm a really different person aside from I seem to be publicly," she concluded. "I'm very, very introverted."

Content 
Genie Gets Her Wish is a video album and a documentary. It features clips from Aguilera's life between 1998 and 1999, while recording and promoting her eponymous debut album, as well as music videos. During the documentary portions, Aguilera is shown rehearsing her performances and recording in studio sessions, while songs from the album play over the clips. She is also shown during performances, as well as CD signings. Through out the video, Aguilera speaks about her career, life, and her influences. The music portions show clips from Aguilera's music videos for "Genie in a Bottle", "So Emotional", and "The Christmas Song (Chestnuts Roasting on an Open Fire)". The music video featured for "When You Put Your Hands on Me" shows Aguilera rehearsing a live performance for the song, as well as clips during the album cover shoot.

Release 
Genie Gets Her Wish was released on VHS in its original release on December 14, 1999. It was re-released on DVD on February 8, 2000. The DVD was later released in Germany on November 9, 2012 through Sony Music.

Track list
"Genie in a Bottle"
"So Emotional"
"Come On Over (All I Want Is You)"
"What a Girl Wants"
"I Turn to You"
"At Last"
"When You Put Your Hands On Me"
"The Christmas Song" ("Chestnuts Roasting On An Open Fire")

Charts and certifications

Weekly charts

Certifications

Release history

Notes

References 

Christina Aguilera video albums
2000 video albums
Live video albums
2000 live albums